Markthalle/Landtag is an underground station on the Hanover Stadtbahn, served by the A lines.

This station consists of a mezzanine level and two side platforms.

References

Hanover Stadtbahn stations